Cochrane Dam is a minor earthfill embankment dam with concrete spillway across Georges Creek, located in the South Coast region of New South Wales, Australia. The main purpose of the dam is to supply water for hydro-power at the downstream Brown Mountain Power Station and for irrigation purposes. The impounded reservoir is called Cochrane Lake.

Location and features
The dam was built by Thiess Bros Pty Limited on behalf of Pacific Power as water storage to assist the control of water flows to the Brown Mountain Power Station, and to supply water for irrigation in the Bega Valley.

The uncontrolled concrete spillway is capable of discharging  at maximum flood level.

Brown Mountain Power Station
A run-of-the-river and now, conventional hydro-electric power station, called Brown Mountain Power Station, is located on the eastern escarpment of the Great Dividing Range inland from Bega and downstream from the dam wall, on the Bemboka River. The power station commenced generating electricity in 1943 and was originally owned and operated by the Bega Valley County Council (since merged). Later, the creation of the Cochrane Dam, regulated flows of water on the Rutherford Creek to the Brown Mountain Power Station and to meet the irrigation requirements of the Bega Valley catchment.

In 2006 an A$6 million upgrade of facilities at the power station was completed with the installation of a new  generating unit, supplied with water from Cochrane Dam. Unit 3 was upgraded with automatic controls; and water supplied from Rutherford Creek for power generation. Units 1, 2, 4 & 5 were decommissioned.

Brown Mountain Power Station is connected to the 66 kV transmission line running between Cooma and Bega substations.

See also

 List of dams and reservoirs in New South Wales

References 

Dams completed in 1958
Dams in New South Wales
Embankment dams